Boto Fagnorena (born 14 January 1985) is a retired Malagasy football striker.

References

1985 births
Living people
Malagasy footballers
Madagascar international footballers
Japan Actuel's FC players
La Passe FC players
Anse Réunion FC players
Association football forwards
Malagasy expatriate footballers
Expatriate footballers in Seychelles
Malagasy expatriate sportspeople in Seychelles
People from Antananarivo